Chengqu, or Cheng District is a district of Jincheng, Shanxi, China.

Administrative divisions

References
www.xzqh.org 

County-level divisions of Shanxi